HackerEarth is an Indian software company headquartered in San Francisco, US, that provides enterprise software that assists organizations with technical hiring. HackerEarth is used by organizations for technical skill assessments and remote video interviewing. In addition, HackerEarth also has built a community of over 4 million developers. In the community, HackerEarth has conducted over 1,000 hackathons and 10,000 programming challenges to date. HackerEarth has raised $11.5 million in funding over three rounds. Currently, more than 750 customers worldwide use its technical coding assessments platform, including Amazon, Walmart Labs, Thoughtworks, Societe Generale, HP, VMware, DBS, HCL, GE, Wipro, Barclays, Pitney Bowes, Intel, and L&T Infotech. HackerEarth is backed by GSF Global and Angelprime.

History

Early years 
Founded in November 2012 by Indian Institute of Technology Roorkee alumni Sachin Gupta and Vivek Prakash, HackerEarth began as MyCareerStack a social interactive platform geared toward technical interviews. Initially, the learning platform was aimed at leveling the playing field for technical interviews for campus students with tutorials on concepts in programming, blogs, interview questions, an online code editor, and a discussion forum.

Later, Sachin and Vivek pivoted the idea to creating an automated technical assessment software product and launched it in February 2013. Two years later, HackerEarth launched its innovation management software and an upgraded version was released in early 2018.

Growth and funding 
The start-up was part of the first batch of GSF Accelerator in 2012, and it later secured $500,000 from early-stage investor Prime Ventures. The Bangalore and California-based company raised $4.5 million in a Series A round funding led by DHI Group Inc. with participation from Prime Ventures and Beenext in February 2017. In December 2018, HackerEarth secured the next round of funding. The Jo Hirao Office led the Series B funding for a total value of $6.5 million.

HackerEarth raised a total of $11,500,000 in funding over three rounds.

The company is headquartered in San Francisco, California, with offices in India and China.

Products and services

HackerEarth Assessments 
HackerEarth Assessments is an ISO certified coding assessment platform that helps organizations hire developers using automated technical coding tests. The proprietary tech assessment platform vets technical talent through skill-based evaluation and analytics.

Facecode 
Facecode is HackerEarth's video interview software for hiring developers.

Remote hiring solutions 
HackerEarth helps organizations remotely source, assess, interview, and hire for developer roles worldwide.

Contests 
HackerEarth Contests include hackathons, programming challenges and coding competitions for developers and companies.

Practice 
HackerEarth Practice offers programming tutorials and practice problems for developers on topics such as data structures, algorithms, math, Python, and machine learning.

HackerEarth Student Ambassador 
The HackerEarth University Ambassador Program is a platform for students to run programming clubs in their universities.

Awards and recognition 
 HackerEarth was a finalist at the Seedstars World start-up competition held in Geneva in February 2014. HackerEarth won the India regional competition for Seedstars, which had over 50 short listed start-ups.
 HackerEarth appeared on Nasscom's EMERGE 10 list in 2015.
 Sachin Gupta was featured on the 2016 Forbes 30 under 30 Asia (Enterprise Technology) list.
 In April 2020, HackerEarth was certified as a great place to work from the Great Place to Work Institute.

Criticism
 HackerEarth does not allow the deletion of accounts, it is merely possible to "deactivate" accounts.

See also 
 Devpost

References

Programming contests
Software companies of India